Burncluith is a rural locality in the Western Downs Region, Queensland, Australia. In the  Burncluith had a population of 150 people.

History 
Burncluith Provisional School opened on 28 July 1909. In 1915 it became Burcluith State School. It closed in August 1962. The school was in Burncluith School Road (now Burncluith Hall Road).

Brownlea State School opened on 31 January 1950 but closed in 1952. It was on the north-east corner of Rennicks Road and G Tennyson Road.

The Burncluith Memorial Hall was opened in 1953 to commemorate those from the district who did military service.

In the  Burncluith had a population of 150 people.

Road infrastructure
The Chinchilla–Wondai Road passes the southern boundary.

Amenities 
Burncluith Memorial Hall is at 1038 Burncluith Hall Road to the east of the former school. It is operated by the Burncluith Memorial Hall Committee. The hall contains the Burncluith Soldiers Memorial Hall Honour Roll which honours those who served in World War II and the Korean War.

References 

Western Downs Region
Localities in Queensland